Njemanica is a village in Bosnia and Herzegovina. According to the 1991 census, the village is located in the municipality of Istočni Stari Grad. According to the 2003 census, there are 143 inhabitants in the village.

References

Populated places in Istočni Stari Grad
Villages in Republika Srpska